The Central District of Bukan County is in West Azerbaijan province, Iran. At the National Census in 2006, its population was 177,236 in 37,525 households. The following census in 2011 counted 199,646 people in 50,216 households. At the latest census in 2016, the district had 224,731 inhabitants in 66,095 households.

References 

Bukan County

Districts of West Azerbaijan Province

Populated places in West Azerbaijan Province

Populated places in Bukan County